Sébastien Callamand (born 26 June 1985) is a French professional footballer who plays as a goalkeeper for PVFC Oyonnax, after having played for 15 years for Bourg-Péronnas.

References

1985 births
Living people
Sportspeople from Bourg-en-Bresse
Footballers from Auvergne-Rhône-Alpes
Association football goalkeepers
French footballers
Ligue 2 players
Championnat National players
Football Bourg-en-Bresse Péronnas 01 players